Thayigintha Devarilla is a 1977 Indian Kannada-language film, directed by Y. R. Swamy and produced by Lakshmi Vajramuni. The film stars Srinath, Jayanthi, Manjula and Lokanath. The film has musical score by Rajan–Nagendra.

Cast

Jayanthi as Vasantha
Manjula
Lokanath
Jayakumar
Seetharam
Joker Shyam
B. S. Narayana Rao
Bhadrachalam
Bhatti Mahadevappa
B. Hanumanthachar
Vajramuni as Sundar
N. S. Rao
Balachandra Pai
B. H. Manohar
Siddalingappa
Kunigal Ramanath
S. K. Ramu
Halasingachar
Raghavendra Raju
B. Jayashree
Pramila Joshai
Shanthamma
Vani Chandra
Prameela
Udayashree
Baby Rekha
Srinath as Hari (cameo)

Soundtrack
The music was composed by Rajan–Nagendra.

References

1977 films
1970s Kannada-language films
Films scored by Rajan–Nagendra
Films directed by Y. R. Swamy